The Great Southern Railways (GSR) Class 850 consisted of a single 2-6-2T tank locomotive built by Inchicore railway works in 1927, the sole example carrying the same number as the class.  It was the first locomotive designed and built by the GSR since it was formed.

Design
The design incorporated elements while retaining some features typical of previous Inchicore engines.  It was suggested that parts of the last unaccounted for Class 393 kit supplied from Woolwich may have been incorporated into the design.

Service
The locomotive worked Dublin—Bray—Greystones services and particularly was noted for regular appearances on the 17:07 Greystones express and Dún Laoghaire pier for the boat connections.  It also had a short spell on Waterford—Limerick services in the 1930s.  The locomotive was powerful but was prone to a rolling motion at speed.  Number 850 was noted for long and frequent periods out of service for repairs.

Incidents
In 1946 the locomotive fell into the turntable pit outside the Dublin Harcourt Street railway station and required extensive repairs.

References

2-6-2T locomotives
5 ft 3 in gauge locomotives
Railway locomotives introduced in 1928
Scrapped locomotives
Steam locomotives of Ireland